The 2004-05 season in Dutch football saw PSV winning the double under the guidance of manager Guus Hiddink. Since PSV won the title in the Eredivisie, the losing KNVB Cup finalist, Willem II, earned the right to play in the UEFA Cup.

Johan Cruijff-schaal

Eredivisie
See Eredivisie 2004-05

Awards

Dutch Footballer of the Year
 2004–05 — Mark van Bommel (PSV)

Dutch Golden Shoe Winner
 2004 — Maxwell (Ajax)
 2005 — Mark van Bommel (PSV)

Eerste Divisie
See Eerste Divisie 2004–05

KNVB Cup

Dutch national team

See also
Sparta Rotterdam season 2004–05

References
 RSSSF Archive